The Siege of Apamea was a failed attempt by the Caesarians near the end of Caesar's Civil War to capture the rebel city of Apamea, Syria Secunda. Lucius Statius Murcus and Quintus Marcius Crispus led the attempt to capture the city, while Equite Quintus Caecilius Bassus led the defence of the city.

Background

Caesar's Civil War began in 49 BC following a decade of escalating tensions between Gaius Julius Caesar and the Roman Senate, who turned to Caesar's old ally Gnaeus Pompeius Magnus ("Pompey the Great"). Caesar famously crossed the Rubicon river in January 49 BC and was thus labelled an "enemy of the people" by the Senate. Caesar would proceed to conquer modern-day Italy, Spain, Sardinia, and Sicily and then invade Greece. Although defeated at the Battle of Dyrrhachium, he eventually crushed Pompey at the Battle of Pharsalus, which saw Pompey flee to Egypt, where he was then assassinated by the Ptolemaic Egyptians in an attempt to appease Caesar. Caesar then intervened in the Alexandrian Civil War to avenge Pompey, eventually helping Cleopatra take the throne by defeating her younger brother Ptolemy XIII at the Battle of the Nile. 

Despite the military victory, and despite a friendly ruler in Egypt, challenges to Caesar's authority continued to rise. In Hispania, modern-day Spain, a pro-Pompeian rebellion rose against Caesar's governor, Quintus Cassius Longinus, led by Marcellus. In the east, Pharnaces II of Pontus, son of the famous Mithridates VI, invaded and began attacking Rome's client states, which Pompey had set up previously, and defeated Caesar's legate, Gnaeus Domitius Calvinus at the Battle of Nicopolis. Meanwhile, a Pompeian fleet under the command of Marcus Octavius arrived near Dalmatia, and Octavius fomented a pro-Pompeian rebellion. This unrest forced Caesar to confront the Pontic king, and Caesar expected a long campaign of hard fighting. However, Pharnaces II charged uphill to Caesar's position in the Battle of Zela and was killed by a usurper, Asander. A future member of the Second Triumvirate, Marcus Aemilius Lepidus quelled the revolt with the help of Maurentania. Publius Vatinius then assembled a small fleet of ships, manned by legionaries who were too sick to join Caesar in Greece and prepared to confront Octavius. Vatinius swiftly won the resulting Battle of Tauris, and Octavius fled to Africa.

Caesar would return to Italy and set about defeating the last of Pompey's supporters in the province of Africa. Caesar's consolidation plan would succeed in 46 BC when he crushed a Pompeian army at the Battle of Thapsus. Many Pompeians were killed in the aftermath including Cato the Younger, Metellus Scipio, Lucius Afranius, Marcus Petreius, Faustus Cornelius Sulla, and the king of Numidia, Juba I. Others had fled to Hispania to continue the fight including Gnaeus Pompeius Magnus, his brother Sextus, Titus Labienus, and the commander of the Pompeian fleet at Thapsus, Publius Attius Varus. Caesar would then fight a long and tough campaign against the Pompeians before eventually crushing them at the Battle of Munda. Many Pompeians including Varus and Labienus were killed. Caesar's men under Lucius Caesennius Lento found Gnaeus Pompey and killed him at the Battle of Lauro. By now, the only main Pompeian leader was Sextus Pompey, who was in the city of Corduba.

Prelude

Following Julius Caesar's victories in the east, he set about establishing his administration in the eastern provinces. He appointed Cleopatra client king of Egypt. He next reaffirmed relations with the Kingdoms of Galatia and Cappadocia through their kings Ariobarzanes and Deiotarus, allowing them to remain kings despite previously supporting Pompey in the Civil War. Finally, Caesar dealt with Syria by appointing his cousin, Sextus Julius Caesar as governor of the province.

The following year, a Pompeian equite by the name of Quintus Caecilius Bassus, who had fought at the Battle of Pharsalus, spread a rumour that Caesar had been defeated and killed in Africa. In this way, Bassus gained a following among the local aristocracy and soldiers, who started a large-scale revolt. Caesar was at this time occupied with a revolt led by the sons of Gnaeus Pompeius Magnus, Sextus and Gnaeus. Unable to directly confront the Syrian revolt, Caesar sent reinforcements instead. Bassus meanwhile had managed to capture the city of Tyre, in modern-day Lebanon, and established it as his base of operations. Despite this early success, Bassus was soon wounded in a pitched battle by Sextus, using his reinforcements from Caesar. but managed to escape the battle on horseback and fled to the province of Cilicia, in modern-day Turkey. He continued his revolt against Sextus, however, and encouraged mutinies and revolts in Syria, one of which resulted in Sextus being killed. Sextus was replaced with acting governor Quintus Cornificius.

The death of Sextus put the province into disarray and paved the way for Bassus to grab power. He assembled an army of slaves, vassals, regional kinglets, Parthians, and the Jewish opposition of Antipater of Idumea, including the Galatian Tetrarch, Deiotarus. Bassus then invaded Syria, meeting little resistance and capturing the majority of the province. He placed himself as acting governor, with his own government, administration, and military forces (militia). By now, Caesar had sent reinforcements under Gaius Antistio Veto, who was to replace Cornificius; Veto arrived shortly thereafter and was received cordially by Cornificius. Vetus's army besieged a city loyal to Bassus, and was initially successful, even being hailed as imperator by the troops. However, the Parthian prince Pacorus I and an old ally of the Parthians, the Arabian king Alcaudonius, attacked and drove the Caesarians away from the city, badly bloodied. Caesar immediately ordered another campaign to finally bring Bassus to heel.

Siege

In the later part of 45 BC, Caesar ordered a new campaign led by Lucius Statius Murcus and Quintus Marcius Crispus. They were further reinforced by a substantial force sent by the king of Judea, Antipater. Bassus retreated to his stronghold of Apamea, on the banks of the river Orontes. We know little of the siege itself, but upon arriving at the city, they established a siege camp. The town was heavily fortified and could not be assaulted directly. As a result, the two Roman commanders decided to besiege it, until the city was starved into submission. The siege continued into 44 BC, when news of the assassination of Caesar arrived. Despite the news, the siege continued until one of Caesar's key assassins, Gaius Cassius Longinus, arrived and killed the Senate's replacement for Vetus, Publius Cornelius Dolabella, at Laodicea. When Cassius arrived at the siege, he offered Bassus and Murcus amnesty to put an end to the siege, although this mercy was not extended to Crispus. This siege was one of the last engagements in Caesar's Civil War.

Aftermath

With the end of the siege, Murcus was given command of the fleet, while Crispus went to govern Bithynia before being stripped of the role by Cassius and probably retiring from public life. Bassus meanwhile disappeared from history and is never mentioned again. He may have fought for Cassius and Marcus Junius Brutus before being killed by Augustus and Mark Antony. The remains of this conflict climaxed in the Liberators' Civil War, in which the former Caesarians, led by Augustus, Antony, and Marcus Aemilius Lepidus, fought the former Pompeians and assassins of Caesar, led by Cassius and Brutus. The war was ultimately concluded with the Battle of Philippi, and both Cassius and Brutus committed suicide when the battle was lost. Relations between Augustus and Antony broke down, and another civil war occurred, which was won by Augustus, led by the general Agrippa at the Battle of Actium. Antony committed suicide in Egypt, and Augustus became master of the Roman republic and eventually its first emperor, thus ushering in a new period in Roman history.

Notes

Sources
 Julius Caesar, Commentarii de Bello Civili 2.40
 Cassius Dio . Roman history . Book 43. Digitized by UChicago . Based on Loeb Classical Library edition volume 3, Ancient Greek-English translation by Earnest Cary, 1924.
 Goldsworthy, Adrian (2006). "XXI". Caesar: Life of a Colossus. New Haven: Yale Press. p. 466.
 Appian . Book 2 of The Civil Wars . Volume 14 of Roman History . Digitized by Perseus . Based on Ancient Greek-English translation by Horace White, London: MacMillan & Co., 1899. pdf
 Canfora, Luciano (2006). Giulio Cesare. Il democratic dittatore. Rome: Laterza.
 Knoblet, Jerry (2005). Herod the Great . University Press of America.
 Usher, James (2003). The Annals of the World . New Leaf Publishing Group.
 Cicero, Marcus Tullius. Cicero De Officiis. London : New York :W. Heinemann; The Macmillan Co., 1913.
 Strabo, Geography 5.3.6. Digital version in Perseus Digital Library online: A. Meineke (ed.), Strabonis Geographica: recognovit Augugtus Meineke., Lipsiae, 1877.

Battles of Caesar's civil war
40s BC conflicts
1st-century BC battles
1st century BC in the Roman Republic
Sieges involving the Roman Republic
Apamea, Syria